The Earth After Us is a 2008 non-fiction book by Jan Zalasiewicz about the geological legacy that humans might one day leave behind them.

External links 
 BBC review
 Review in Science Daily
 Review in The Guardian

See also
The World Without Us
Life After People
After Man

2008 non-fiction books
2008 in the environment
Environmental non-fiction books
Futurology books